The Piney River is a  tributary of the Tye River in the U.S. state of Virginia. It is part of the James River watershed.

The river rises in the Blue Ridge Mountains at the confluence of its North and South forks. For its entire length it forms the boundary between Amherst and Nelson counties. It flows southeast into the Virginia Piedmont, passing the villages of Lowesville and Piney River.

See also
List of rivers of Virginia

References

USGS Hydrologic Unit Map - State of Virginia (1974)

Rivers of Virginia
Tributaries of the James River
Rivers of Amherst County, Virginia
Rivers of Nelson County, Virginia